Jamie Reid (April 10, 1941 – June 25, 2015) was a Canadian writer, activist, and arts organizer. He was born in Timmins, Ontario and came of age on the west coast of Canada.

Reid co-founded the influential poetry journal TISH in Vancouver in 1961 with George Bowering, Frank Davey, David Dawson, and Fred Wah. He published his first collection of poems, The Man Whose Path Was on Fire, in 1969. A short time later he joined the Communist Party of Canada (Marxist-Leninist) and stopped writing for 25 years in favour of political activism "because [he] didn’t have a way of working the language of politics into the language of poetry."

Reid returned to poetry and cultural criticism in the late 1980s, with a special interest in jazz expressed in many of his works. He lived in North Vancouver with his wife, the painter Carol Reid, since returning to Vancouver in 1990, and their home was a hub of literary activism and activity, including the publication of his local/international avant-garde magazine DaDaBaBy. Reid also edited and contributed to the intergenerational Vancouver literary journal Tads (1996-2001) through which Reid, George Bowering, Renee Rodin, and George Stanley mentored younger writers, including Thea Bowering, Wayde Compton, Reg Johanson, Ryan Knighton, Jason le Heup, Cath Morris, Chris Turnbull, and Karina Vernon.

Bibliography

Poetry
The Man Whose Path Was on Fire (1969)
Prez: Homage to Lester Young (1994)
Mad Boys (1997)
I. Another. The Space Between: Selected Poems (2004)
A Temporary Stranger: Homages, Poems and Recollections (2017)

Biography
Diana Krall: The Language of Love (2002)
Chris Isaak: Wicked Games (2006)

References

External links
"Vancouver writer and activist fought for justice, decency", obituary by Dennis E. Bolen
Jamie Reid, ABCBookworld, biography
"Can You Hear Me Now? A Tribute to Jamie Reid", edited by Carol Reid (Blurb, 2011)
, reading, Vancouver BC, 2010

TPRRB Issue 8
Jamie and Himself: An Interview With Canada's Jamie Reid, Word Arc, 2008
The East Village Poetry Web, Poetries of Canada, Jamie Reid
*Remembering Allen, homage to Allen Ginsberg, 1997
Records of James Reid are held by Simon Fraser University's Special Collections and Rare Books
At Penn Sound Poetry Archive, 1
At Penn Sound Poetry Archive, 2

1941 births
2015 deaths
20th-century Canadian poets
Canadian communists
Canadian male poets
Writers from Timmins